Liu Kan may refer to:

Personal name of Emperor Ping of Han
Liu Kan (general)
Liu Bingzhong